Amiga User International (or AUI) was a monthly computer magazine published in its later years by AUI Limited, it was the first dedicated Amiga magazine in Europe and in comparison to other Amiga magazines, AUI had a more serious perspective. One of the main features of AUI was the "AUI SuperDisks", which implemented multiple file systems and advanced compression techniques to hold far more data than a standard magazine cover disk.

History
The magazine was first published in November 1986 as an insert to Commodore Computing International. In January 1988 it became an independent magazine. The last issue of Amiga User International appeared in May 1997. A total of 127 issues was published.

Amiga User International was published by different companies during its existence. The magazine was started by Croftward Limited and published by the company until October 1990. Then Maxwell Specialist Magazines published it from November 1990 to 1992. Headway, Home & Law was the publisher between 1992 and 1994. From 1994 to its demise in 1997 the magazine was published by AUI Limited.

See also

Amiga Survivor

References

External links 
  - Relaunched June 2010
Musings from Tony Horgan
David Viner - UK computer magazines
Archived Amiga User International magazines on the Internet Archive

Amiga magazines
Defunct computer magazines published in the United Kingdom
Magazines established in 1986
Magazines disestablished in 1997
Monthly magazines published in the United Kingdom
Video game magazines published in the United Kingdom